The Challenge Cup, hosted annually by the Elite Ice Hockey League, is a cup competition for ice hockey clubs in the United Kingdom. It is one of three competitions run each season by the Elite League, the others being the league championship and the playoff championship  which also crowns the national champion. Prior to the formation of the Elite League in 2003, the Challenge Cup was organised by the Ice Hockey Superleague.

First awarded during the 1997–98 season, the Challenge Cup has had numerous different formats depending on the number of teams participating and the format of other competitions run during a particular season. The first six finals were single games played at a pre-determined venue, and during the first eleven seasons of the Elite League finals were contested over two legs. The final returned to a single game in the 2014–15 season. No final was contested in 2020–21, as the season was cancelled due to the coronavirus pandemic.

The current holders of the trophy are the Belfast Giants, who retained the trophy having defeated the Fife Flyers 9-3 in the 2022-23 final. The Giants won four of the five Challenge Cups up to 2023.  

The Nottingham Panthers are the competition's most successful team, having won the title eight times, including five in succession between 2010 and 2014. The Sheffield Steelers come next, having been champions five times. The Belfast Giants have also won the title five times, while the Cardiff Devils have won it three times.

History

In 1997 the Ice Hockey Superleague reduced the league schedule from the 42 rounds of the previous season to 28. The league had hoped to arrange a new competition involving teams from Europe, leading to the shortening of the regular season. When this failed to materialise, clubs were faced with a shortfall in their fixtures. With sponsorship from the Daily Express, the Challenge Cup was launched as a result. The competition was won by the Ayr Scottish Eagles, who defeated the Bracknell Bees 3–2 in the final at the Telewest Arena. The Eagles had already won the Benson & Hedges Cup and the Superleague title and would go on to complete a Grand Slam by winning the playoff championship.

The regular season schedule returned to 42 rounds for the 1998–99 season and certain league fixtures were also designated as Challenge Cup semi final qualifiers. This format would prevail for the next three seasons. The final was held at Sheffield Arena between the Nottingham Panthers and the Sheffield Steelers and was won 4–0 by the Steelers with goals from Teeder Wynne, John Wynne, Ed Courtenay and an empty net goal from Ken Priestlay. The Steelers successfully defended the title in the 1999–00 season, defeating the same opposition 2–1 at London Arena.

The 2000–01 final was held at the newly opened Odyssey Arena in Belfast, despite calls from the Northern Ireland Assembly to postpone the game because of the foot-and mouth outbreak. The final was also put into doubt when Sheffield Steelers players threatened to strike over unpaid wages. The game eventually went ahead as planned, with the Steelers defeating the Ayr Scottish Eagles 4–2 to win a third consecutive Challenge Cup and their third title of the season. They went on to win the playoff championship, becoming the second team to win the Challenge Cup as part of a Grand Slam season.

The Odyssey Arena played host to the final again in 2002. The Ayr Scottish Eagles made a second consecutive appearance, this time facing the Belfast Giants. The Giants had won the Superleague title by 21 points and had defeated the Eagles in seven out of eight regular season meetings, tying the other. Furthermore, the Giants had lost just twice at the Odyssey Arena during the regular season. Despite being the underdog, the Eagles took an early 2–0 lead and went on to win the Cup with a 5–0 victory.

The 2002–03 season was the final season of the Superleague. The cup format was changed with a round-robin group stage at the beginning of the season. British National League side Coventry Blaze took part alongside the seven Superleague sides. Initially London, Nottingham, Sheffield and the holders Scottish Eagles (by now playing in Glasgow having dropped Ayr from their name) qualified for the semi finals. However the Eagles withdrew from the league in November because of financial problems and their place was taken by Belfast. In the semi finals, both played at Sheffield Arena, Nottingham defeated Belfast 3–2 and Sheffield defeated London on penalty shots after a 4–4 tie. In the final at Manchester Arena, the Steelers claimed their fourth Challenge Cup title with a 3–2 win over their arch rivals. Nottingham came from 3–0 down with two late goals but the Steelers held on for victory.

The following season saw the launch of the Elite Ice Hockey League in place of the Superleague. The final was changed from a single game to a two-legged tie and the first round of the competition was reverted to the system used between 1998 and 2002, with designated league fixtures counting separately as Challenge Cup games. The final brought together the Nottingham Panthers and Sheffield Steelers, the fourth time to two clubs had met at this stage of the competition. The first leg, held at the National Ice Centre, ended in a 1–1 tie. In the second leg the Panthers took an early 2–0 lead, but Sheffield fought back to level the match at 2–2, forcing overtime. After 53 seconds of the extra session, Kim Ahlroos scored for the Panthers, earning them their first ever victory in a final against the Steelers and their first cup win since 1998.

The 2004–05 season saw the Coventry Blaze face the Cardiff Devils in the final. The Blaze had defeated the holders Nottingham to reach the final, while the Devils defeated Sheffield, the previous season's runner-up. The first leg in Coventry was won 6–1 by the home side. The Devils took a 4–1 lead in the second leg, but the Blaze fought back to win the match 5–4 and win the cup with an 11–5 aggregate victory. The Blaze would go to win the Elite League and playoff championships, becoming the third team to win the Challenge Cup as part of a Grand Slam winning season. The two sides met again in the final a year later, with the Blaze again winning the first leg in Coventry, this time 3–0. In the second leg the Devils emerged as 4–1 winners, tying the final 4–4 on aggregate. With overtime unable to separate the two sides, the Devils lifted their first Challenge Cup following a 1–0 win in a penalty shootout.

Coventry made their third successive appearance in the final in 2006–07, this time facing the Sheffield Steelers. For the third season running, the Blaze hosted the first leg, winning 4–3. The second leg was held at Sheffield Arena six weeks later, with the Blaze winning 5–1, regaining the cup with a 9–4 aggregate victory. The Challenge Cup was the second part of a Double won by the Blaze, the club having also secured the league championship a week earlier. The Steelers returned to the final in 2008, facing their arch rivals Nottingham Panthers. The first leg was held in Sheffield, with Nottingham securing a 6–3 win. In the second leg the Steelers took a 2–0 lead after the first period, narrowing the aggregate score to 6–5. The Panthers tied the game 2–2 and restored their three-goal advantage during the second period, but Sheffield scored twice in the third period to make the score 4–2 and again take them within one goal of tying the final. With five minutes to go, Ryan Shmyr scored for Nottingham, giving the Panthers a 4–3 deficit on the night but a 9–7 lead on aggregate. The Panthers held on to win their second Challenge Cup title.

Finals

1997-03: Superleague era

2003–present: Elite League era

2003–14: Two-legged finals

2014–present: Single-game finals

Total titles won

References

Ice hockey competitions in the United Kingdom
Ice hockey competitions in Scotland